Wolffs Telegraphisches Bureau (1849–1934) was founded by the German Bernhard Wolff (1811–1879), the editor of the Vossische Zeitung and founder of the National Zeitung (1848–1938).
It was one of the first press agencies in Europe and one of the three major European telegraph news monopolies until the World War II-era, along with the British Reuters and the French Havas.

References

News agencies based in Germany